Just Cause Y'all Waited is the twelfth mixtape by American rapper Lil Durk. It was released on March 30, 2018, by Only the Family and Empire Distribution. The mixtape features guest appearances from Lil Baby, Ty Dolla Sign, PartyNextDoor, Gunna, and TK Kravitz. The production on the mixtape was handled by Nard & B, Supreme Beats, ATL Jacob and DY, among others.

Background
On March 29, 2018, Lil Durk announced the mixtape's title, artwork and release date.

On April 11, 2018, in an exclusive interview with Billboard, Durk spoke on his departure from Def Jam Records amid creative differences and wanted to show fans the new and improved version of himself as an independent artist with the release of Just 'Cause Y'all Waited.

On April 20, 2018, Durk was featured in an exclusive interview with Respect., in which he described the inspiration for the mixtape, by saying:

Critical reception

Dean Van Nguyen of Pitchfork wrote "It's the only wasted motion on Just Cause Y'all Waited, which will likely go down as a minor release in Durk's canon. Even so, this mixtape is a reminder that he's one of his city's most compelling correspondents."

Track listing

Notes
  Signifies an uncredited co-producer
 "Home Body" also appears on Lil Durk's third studio album,"Signed to the Streets 3"

Sample credits
 "1 (773) Vulture" contains a sample from "1-800-273-8255", performed by Logic.

Charts

References

2018 mixtape albums
Albums produced by Nard & B
Albums produced by TM88
Lil Durk albums